George Cromwell (July 3, 1860 – September 17, 1934) was an American lawyer and politician from New York.

Life
He was the son of Henry Bowman Cromwell, founder of the Cromwell Shipping Line, and Sarah (Seaman) Cromwell. He attended Brooklyn Polytechnic Institute, and graduated from Yale College in 1883. He graduated from Columbia Law School in 1886, and practiced law with the firm of Elihu Root until 1889. He was a member of the New York State Assembly (Richmond County) in 1888.

From 1889 to 1897, he practiced law with the firm of Butler, Stillman & Hubbard, and was in charge of the admiralty law branch. In 1897, he opened his own law office on Broadway (Manhattan).

After the consolidation of New York City, he was elected the first Borough President of Richmond in a very close and contested election, with a margin of only six votes, that was decided by the New York State Court of Appeals.  He was elected three times, and served from 1898 to 1913.

He was a member of the New York State Senate (23rd D.) from 1915 to 1918, sitting in the 138th, 139th, 140th and 141st New York State Legislatures. He declined to run for re-election in 1918. On June 1, 1915, in his first senate term, he married Hermine de Rouville, a member of the noted Hertel de Rouville family of Quebec. They had no children.

On September 11, 1934, he suffered a stroke, and died six days later in Dongan Hills, Staten Island. He was buried at the Moravian Cemetery in New Dorp, Staten Island.

References

External links
 Official New York from Cleveland to Hughes by Charles Elliott Fitch (Hurd Publishing Co., New York and Buffalo, 1911, vol. IV, p. 324)
 Cromwell Put on the Fusion Slate in The New York Times on September 29, 1909

1860 births
1934 deaths
Republican Party New York (state) state senators
Staten Island borough presidents
Republican Party members of the New York State Assembly
Yale College alumni
Polytechnic Institute of New York University alumni
Columbia Law School alumni
Politicians from Staten Island
Burials at Moravian Cemetery